Baskerville Raceway is a  permanent motor racing circuit located at 473 Baskerville Rd, Old Beach - a northern suburb of Hobart, Tasmania, Australia. Founded in 1954, the Hobart Sporting Car Club built the circuit in a natural amphitheatre on land provided by Calvin Morrisby (after whom turn 7 is named). The circuit was officially opened on 9 February 1958 by then Tasmanian Premier Robert Cosgrove with 20,000 spectators in attendance, and has been operating continuously ever since. Baskerville is the second oldest continuously operating motor racing venue in Australia, with only Mount Panorama (which opened in 1938) being older.

History

Previously, Baskerville had hosted the Winfield 25's Touring Car Challenge, Australian Sports Car Championship, Australian Formula 2 Championship, Australian Road Racing Championships (motorcycles), Australian Superbike Championships and other races. Baskerville was the location for the 2006 Australian Improved Production Nationals and for the 2009 Formula Vee Nationals, with the latter won by Daniel Reynolds in a Sabre 01.

Baskerville Raceway hosted the inaugural Tasmanian Historic Motorcycle Championships from 25 to 27 November 2011.

In recent years Baskerville Raceway has hosted the Baskerville Historics, the largest event at Baskerville Raceway. The event includes both cars and bikes over a three-day event, and has brought the likes of former V8 Supercars driver Glen Seton and current co-owner of V8 Supercar team Prodrive racing Australia, Rusty French.

In 2012 the owning club, Hobart Sporting Car Club, launched the Baskerville Foundation, a fundraising initiative to bring the circuit to a more modern standard with the ultimate goal of a full resurface of the track.

In 2015 the circuit gained a naming rights sponsor in Pepsi Max, with the circuit changing its name to Pepsi Max Baskerville Raceway

The circuit now holds several events including the Tasmanian Super Series, Tasmanian Drift Series, the Baskerville Historics the Baskerville 2-Hour Motorcycle Race and several smaller events. The Circuit also hosts several non-Motorsport events such as the Raw Challenge.

In January 2021, the circuit also hosted non-championship round for the Touring Car Masters, TCR Australia Touring Car Series, and Trans-Am Australia Series after their first round in Symmons Plains Raceway.

Motorcycle Racing and Track Days
Motorcycle racing and public ride days are currently run by the Sports Riders Club of Tasmania (SRCT), one of only two club-run ride days in Australia.

Lap records

The official fastest race lap records at the Baskerville Raceway are listed as:

See also
 Sport in Tasmania

References

External links
Official Site
nmd.com.au Motorsport News
Google Maps
Sports Riders Club of Tasmania

Motorsport venues in Tasmania
Sports venues in Tasmania
Motorsport in Tasmania